Fíaskó (English title: Fiasco) is an Icelandic film written and directed by Ragnar Bragason and released in 2000.

Synopsis
The film is divided into three chapters and looks at three generations of a family living under one roof in Reykjavík. The first part focuses on pensioner Karl Barðdal. The second is about his granddaughter, Júlía Barðdal. The third part deals with Steingerður Barðdal and her relationship with the preacher Samúel.

Cast and characters
 Margrét Ákadóttir as Steingerður Barðdal
 Silja Hauksdóttir as Júlía Barðdal
 Róbert Arnfinnsson as Karl Barðdal
 Eggert Þorleifsson as Samúel
 Björn Jörundur Friðbjörnsson as Hilmar
 Kristbjörg Kjeld as Helga
 Ólafur Darri Ólafsson as Gulli
 Tristan Gribbin as Nicole

External links
 Fíaskó at  Zikzak Filmworks
 

2000 films
2000 comedy films
2000s Icelandic-language films
Films directed by Ragnar Bragason
Icelandic comedy films